Alexia Castilhos (born 13 February 1995) is a Brazilian judoka.

She is the silver medallist of the 2019 Judo Grand Slam Brasilia in the -63 kg category.

References

External links

 

1995 births
Living people
Brazilian female judoka
Judoka at the 2019 Pan American Games
Medalists at the 2019 Pan American Games
Pan American Games medalists in judo
Pan American Games bronze medalists for Brazil
21st-century Brazilian women
20th-century Brazilian women